Operation Wandering Soul was a propaganda campaign and psychological warfare effort exercised by U.S. forces during the Vietnam War. It was an attempt to increase desertions and defections from Việt Cộng forces and weaken their morale.

Psychological warfare campaign 
Like most cultures, Vietnamese culture includes beliefs and rituals that show respect for the dead. Vietnamese culture calls for a proper burial and it is believed that if this does not occur, the soul of the deceased continues to wander the earth thus becoming a "Wandering Soul," equivalent to a ghost or spirit. 
It is the Vietnamese belief that the dead must be buried in their homeland, or their soul will wander aimlessly in pain and suffering. Vietnamese feel that if a person is improperly buried, then their soul wanders constantly. They can sometimes be contacted on the anniversary of their death and near where they died. Vietnamese honor these dead souls on a holiday when they return to the site where they died. The U.S. used this to their advantage and tried to trick the Viet-Congs into leaving by playing the audio recording of their dead friends wandering around.

Voice recordings 
U.S. engineers spent weeks recording eerie sounds and altered voices, which acted in roles of slain Việt Cộng soldiers. The United States of America also brought in South Vietnamese soldiers to record their audio sayings over the tape for further authenticity. The tape, dubbed Ghost Tape Number Ten, was played on loudspeakers in areas of Việt Cộng activity, generally at night. Helicopters were also deployed at times to broadcast recordings in which the pre-recorded voices called on their "descendants" in the Việt Cộng to defect and cease fighting. The United States would also use patrol boats going up and down the river playing the ghost tape. The United States would also deploy special infantry to infiltrate enemy lines and play the recording too. Most of these types of operations did take place at night.

Results 

The overall success of these ghost tapes was mixed, because in the event that the Việt Cộng soldiers knew it was just a recording, their immediate response would be to fire upon where the sound was coming from, which in turn revealed their hidden positions within the jungle. The United States ultimately stopped Ghost 10 in the early 1970's.

See also
 Psychological operations (United States)

References

Bibliography
 

 

 Hoyt, Alia. "Ghost Tape No. 10: The Haunted Mixtape of the Vietnam War". HowStuffWorks. Retrieved 21 November 2021.

External links
 Mixtape: The Wandering Soul, an episode of Radiolab
 Superstition PSYOP 
Wandering Soul
Psychological warfare